The Second Federal Parliament of Nepal, was elected by the 2022 general elections on 20 November 2022. The elections elected 275 Members of Parliament (MPs), 165 for each constituency and 110 through the party list, to the House of Representatives. The parliament convened for the first time on 9 January 2023.

Leaders

House of Representatives

Office bearers 

 Speaker of the House of Representatives: Rt. Hon. Dev Raj Ghimire (CPN (UML))
 Deputy Speaker of the House of Representatives: Hon. Indira Ranamagar (Rastriya Swatantra Party)
 Leader of the House of Representatives (Prime Minister): Rt. Hon. Pushpa Kamal Dahal (CPN (Maoist Centre))
 Leader of the Opposition: Sher Bahadur Deuba (Nepali Congress)

Parliamentary party leaders 

 Parliamentary party leader of Nepali Congress: Hon. Sher Bahadur Deuba
 Parliamentary party leader of CPN (UML): Hon. K.P. Sharma Oli
 Parliamentary party leader of CPN (Maoist Centre): Hon. Pushpa Kamal Dahal
 Parliamentary party leader of Rastriya Swatantra Party: 
 Hon. Rabi Lamichhane (until 27 January 2023)
 Hon. Dol Prasad Aryal (since 28 January 2023)
 Deputy Parliamentary party leader of Rastriya Swatantra Party: Hon. Biraj Bhakta Shrestha
 Parliamentary party leader of Rastriya Prajatantra Party: Hon. Rajendra Lingden
 Parliamentary party leader of People's Socialist Party: Vacant
 Parliamentary party leader of CPN (Unified Socialist): Hon. Madhav Kumar Nepal
 Deputy parliamentary party leader of CPN (Unified Socialist): Hon. Rajendra Pandey
 Parliamentary party leader of Janamat Party: Hon. Chandra Kant Raut
 Deputy parliamentary party leader of Janamat Party: Hon. Abdul Khan
Parliamentary party leader of Nagrik Unmukti Party: Hon. Ranjeeta Shrestha
Parliamentary party leader of Loktantrik Samajwadi Party: Hon. Mahantha Thakur

Whips 

 Chief Whip of Nepali Congress: Hon. Ramesh Lekhak
 Chief Whip of CPN (Maoist Centre): Hon. Hit Raj Pandey
 Chief Whip of Rastriya Swatantra Party: Hon. Santosh Pariyar
 Chief Whip of Rastriya Prajatantra Party: Hon. Gyanendra Shahi
 Chief Whip of CPN (Unified Socialist): Hon. Prakash Jwala
 Chief Whip of Janamat Party: Hon. Anita Devi Sah
 Whip of Janamat Party: Hon. Goma Labh
Chief Whip of Nagrik Unmukti Party: Hon. Ganga Ram Chaudhary
Whip of Nagrik Unmukti Party: Hon. Arun Kumar Chaudhary

National Assembly

Office bearers 

 Chairperson of the National Assembly: Rt. Hon. Ganesh Prasad Timilsina (CPN (UML))
 Vice-Chairperson of the National Assembly: Hon. Urmila Aryal (CPN (Maoist Centre)) (since 6 February 2023)

Parliamentary party leaders 

 Parliamentary party leader of CPN (UML): Hon. Devendra Dahal
 Parliamentary party leader of CPN (Maoist Centre): Hon. Narayan Kaji Shrestha
 Parliamentary party leader of Nepali Congress: Hon. Ramesh Jung Rayamajhi
 Parliamentary party leader of CPN (Unified Socialist): Hon. Beduram Bhusal

Whips 

 Chief Whip of CPN (Maoist Centre): Hon. Gopi Bahadur Sarki
 Whip of CPN (Maoist Centre): Hon. Ganga Belbase

Members of the House of Representatives

Members

Suspensions

Defections

Vacations

Members of the National Assembly

Parliamentary committees

Explanatory notes

References

External links 

 प्रतिनिधि सभा समानुपातिक निर्वाचन प्रणाली तर्फ निर्वाचित सदस्यहरुको विवरण (Report of members elected to the House of Representatives via proportional voting) (in Nepali)

Nepal
Members of the National Assembly (Nepal)
Nepal MPs 2022–present